Man Without a Name is a 1976 Hungarian drama film directed by László Lugossy. It was entered into the 26th Berlin International Film Festival where it won the Silver Bear for an outstanding single achievement.

Cast
 György Cserhalmi - Ambrus András
 Róbert Koltai - Kelemen
 Ludovít Gresso - Miska bácsi (as Ludovit Gressó)
 Mari Kiss - Sári
 Péter Blaskó - Rendõrhadnagy
 Judit Pogány - Vöröskeresztes nõ
 Sándorné Czár - Annus néni
 Géza Polgár - Fogadóbizottsági tag
 István Jeney - Fogadóbizottsági tag
 László Soós - Kártyás (as László Sós)
 Lili Monori - Csatóné
 István Szilágyi - Katona
 Tibor Molnár - Péter bácsi
 Hédi Temessy - Énekesnõ
 István Hunyadkürthy - Hadifogoly (as Hunyadkürti István)
 József Madaras - Csató Mihály
 Piroska Molnár - Kötényes nõ

References

External links

1976 films
1970s Hungarian-language films
1976 drama films
Films directed by László Lugossy
Silver Bear for outstanding artistic contribution
Hungarian drama films